The 1975 Grantland Rice Bowl was an NCAA Division II game following the 1975 season, between the Western Kentucky Hilltoppers and the New Hampshire Wildcats. This was the second and last time that the game was played at Tiger Stadium on the campus of LSU. WKU defensive tackle Sam Fields was named the game's outstanding defensive player, while his teammate running back Lawrence Jefferson was named the game's outstanding offensive player.

Notable participants
WKU wide receiver Rick Caswell was selected in the 1976 NFL Draft, while center David Carter was selected in the 1977 NFL Draft. Carter, linebacker Rick Green, and head coach Jimmy Feix are inductees of the WKU Athletic Hall of Fame.

New Hampshire linebacker Dave Rozumek was selected in the 1976 NFL Draft. Linebacker Bruce Huther was undrafted in 1977, but later played in the NFL.  Rozumek, Huther, center Kevin Martell, quarterback Jeff Allen, tackle Grady Vigneau, and head coach Bill Bowes are inductees of the New Hampshire hall of fame. Bowes is an inductee of the College Football Hall of Fame.

Scoring summary

References

Further reading
 

Grantland
Grantland Rice Bowl
New Hampshire Wildcats football bowl games
Western Kentucky Hilltoppers football bowl games
December 1975 sports events in the United States
Grantland Rice